Eleanor Thom was born in London in 1979. She is a British writer who won a major UK creative writing competition, New Writing Ventures 2006, with "Burns", a chapter from her first novel "The Tin-Kin" (Gerald Duckworth and Company Ltd 2009). The book recalls experiences of her mother's family who were Scottish Travellers and settled in Elgin, between 1920 and 1950. It won the Scottish First Book of the Year in 2009.
In 2008, Eleanor was awarded a Robert Louis Stevenson Fellowship to begin work on a second novel.

Eleanor attended Chesham High School, 1995–1997, and later studied at University College London, and The University of Glasgow.

References

External links
 Official Homepage
 BBC News Article

British writers
1979 births
Living people
Alumni of University College London
Alumni of the University of Glasgow